De dragoste are Romanian popular love songs and poetic. More specifically, De dragoste is a special musical category played in the south of Walachia, in the Danube Plain.

Romanian music